Brave Little Tailor is a 1938 American animated short film produced by Walt Disney Productions and released by RKO Radio Pictures. It is an adaptation of the fairy tale The Valiant Little Tailor with Mickey Mouse in the title role. It was directed by Bill Roberts and features original music by Albert Hay Malotte. The voice cast includes Walt Disney as Mickey, Marcellite Garner as Minnie, and Eddie Holden as the Giant. It was the 103rd short in the Mickey Mouse film series to be released, and the fifth for that year.

The film was nominated for the Academy Award for Best Animated Short Film at the 11th Academy Awards in 1939, but lost to Ferdinand the Bull, another short by Disney. In 1994, it was listed as the 26th greatest cartoon of all time by members of the animation field in a list compiled for the book The 50 Greatest Cartoons.

Plot
During the Middle Ages in Europe, a king is seeking a brave warrior to kill a giant who has been terrorizing his small kingdom. There is much discussion in the village, but no one is willing to take on the task. While this is happening, a young peasant tailor (Mickey Mouse) kills seven flies at once while at his work. He unknowingly interrupts a conversation among several other peasants about the problems with the giant to brag loudly about his accomplishment:

Peasant (to his friends): "Say, did you ever kill a giant?"
Mickey (sticking his head out his window): "I killed seven with one blow!"

Gossip that Mickey has killed seven giants with one blow quickly spreads around the kingdom. The king summons him and asks if he really "killed seven at one blow". He goes into an elaborate retelling of how he killed the seven (flies, not giants as the king believes), which impresses the king enough to appoint him "Royal High Killer of the Giant". On discovering the misunderstanding, all of Mickey's confidence disappears, and he attempts to stammer his way out of the assignment. The king thinks he is holding out for a bigger payday and offers him increasingly vast riches and then (at her suggestion) the hand of his only daughter, Princess Minnie, in marriage if he can kill, or at least subdue, the giant. Smitten with Minnie, Mickey proclaims that he'll "cut [the giant] down to my size", and sets off for the giant's lair. When the gates of the town close behind him, however, his confidence fails him and he wants to turn back, but he sees Minnie and the townspeople screaming him on from the walls and decides to soldier on.

"Gosh," Mickey sighs to himself, wondering what to do. "I dunno how to catch a giant." Just then, the giant appears, forcing Mickey to scramble for a place to hide as the giant crushes rocks, trees, and buildings under his feet while searching the countryside for food. He sits down on a barn and eats a cart of pumpkins as if they were grapes. Mickey, who was hiding in the cart with the pumpkins, clings to the giant's uvula to keep from being swallowed, which gives the giant a case of the hiccups. To remedy this, the giant pulls a water well from the ground and drinks from it as though it were a thermos, and Mickey is saved from the giant's stomach by clinging to the well's bucket. The reprieve is short-lived, however, as the giant almost immediately grabs the haystack in which Mickey seeks refuge and rolls it into a cigarette, lighting it with the stove from a nearby house (after he lifts off the roof to get it). He then leans on a silo to relax. The smoke makes Mickey sneeze, which finally brings him to the attention of the giant.

The giant, after getting poked in the nose with a pair of scissors, attempts to squash Mickey, but misses. Mickey lures the giant into reaching under his sleeves and quickly produces a needle and thread and binds the giant's limbs. He then lassos the giant's nose and pulls it up, preventing him from opening his eyes, before swinging around him and then tripping him. The giant falls down, landing with such force that a chunk of earth flies in the air and lands on his head, knocking him out. Mickey dusts his hands triumphantly.

Following the giant's defeat, an amusement park is built on the site of the battle. The carnival rides are powered, via a series of belts and gears connected to a windmill, by wind from the snoring giant, who is chained to the ground. The film ends with the king and a newly married Mickey and Minnie enjoying a ride on the carousel.

Adaptations
From August 28 to November 27, 1938, the Mickey Mouse comic strip published 14 Sunday newspaper comics retelling the story under the title The Brave Little Tailor. This version was bookended by segments showing the "real" Mickey Mouse as an actor who is cast by Walt Disney to appear in the film. The comic has Mac MacCorker as the fictional director of the short. Goofy also appears in these scenes and, after the wrap he is wearing the same clothes he wore in the short film The Whalers, which was released the month before Tailor. The story was written by Merrill De Maris and drawn by Manuel Gonzales and Floyd Gottfredson, with inking by Ted Thwaites.

In 1985, Bantam Books published a children's book called Mickey Meets the Giant which featured Mickey encountering the same giant as the one in this short. This version was somewhat more faithful to the original fairy tale, maintaining that the tailor fools the giant by apparently beating him in feats of strength.

Home media
The short was released on December 4, 2001 as part of Walt Disney Treasures: Mickey Mouse in Living Color. It was also featured, along with A Knight for a Day, on DVD releases of The Sword in the Stone and was included in the 2018 Celebrating Mickey Blu-ray/DVD/Digital combo compilation and in the 2023 Mickey & Minnie: 10 Classic Shorts - Volume 1 Blu-ray/DVD/Digital combo compilation.

See also
Mickey Mouse (film series)

References

External links
 
 
 

1938 films
1930s color films
1938 animated films
1930s Disney animated short films
Mickey Mouse short films
Films based on Grimms' Fairy Tales
Films about giants
Films directed by Bill Roberts
Films produced by Walt Disney
1930s American films